This article lists the winners and nominees for the Black Reel Award for Television for Outstanding Actor, Drama Series. This category was first introduced in 2017 and won by Sterling K. Brown for This Is Us. Brown currently holds the record for most wins in this category with 4 and is the most nominated person in this category with 5 nominations.

Winners and nominees
Winners are listed first and highlighted in bold.

2010s

2020s

Superlatives

Programs with multiple awards

4 awards
 This Is Us

Performers with multiple awards

4 awards
 Sterling K. Brown (2 consecutive)

Programs with multiple nominations

5 nominations 
 This Is Us

4 nominations
 Queen Sugar

3 nominations
 Pose
 Snowfall

2 nominations
 Godfather of Harlem
 Lupin

Performers with multiple nominations

5 nominations 
 Sterling K. Brown

4 nominations
 Kofi Siriboe

3 nominations
 Damson Idris
 Billy Porter

2 nominations
 Omar Sy
 Forest Whitaker

Total awards by network
 NBC - 4
 FX - 1
 HBO - 1

References

Black Reel Awards